The 1998 SEC men's basketball tournament took place from March 5–8, 1998 at the Georgia Dome in Atlanta, Georgia. Kentucky won the tournament and received the SEC's automatic bid to the NCAA tournament by beating the South Carolina Gamecocks on March 8, 1998.

Television coverage
Tournament coverage in the first and second rounds, and the semi-finals were provided by Jefferson Pilot Sports, who at the time was in its 11th season with regional syndication rights to the SEC. The championship game, however, was broadcast by CBS Sports.

Bracket

Tournament notes 
This was Tubby Smith’s first SEC tournament title win as head coach of the Kentucky Wildcats.

References

SEC men's basketball tournament
1997–98 Southeastern Conference men's basketball season
March 1998 sports events in the United States
1998 in sports in Georgia (U.S. state)
1998 in Atlanta
College sports in Georgia (U.S. state)
Basketball in Georgia (U.S. state)